Erol Togay (1 February 1950 – 9 August 2012) was a Turkish football player and manager. He played as a defender for Fenerbahçe, Vefa (1968–1972), Altay (1972–1978) and Adana Demirspor (1981–1984) and the Turkey national team.

Career
Togay played for Turkey in five qualifying matches for the 1978 FIFA World Cup.

Togay was appointed as Fenerbahçe coach in 1991, succeeding Guus Hiddink. He managed Fenerbahçe in two games. He also managed Çanakkale Dardanelspor, Zeytinburnuspor, Küçükçekmecespor, Zonguldakspor, Düzcespor and Konyaspor.

Personal life
He had multiple sclerosis since 1999.

References

External links
 

1950 births
2012 deaths
Turkish footballers
Association football defenders
Turkey international footballers
Altay S.K. footballers
Adana Demirspor footballers
Fenerbahçe S.K. footballers
Turkish football managers
Fenerbahçe football managers
Karşıyaka S.K. managers
Turkey under-21 international footballers